Metatron is the name of an angel in Judaism and some branches of Christianity and Islam.

Metatron may also refer to:

Music
Metatron (Mark Stewart album), 1990
Metatron (Praxis album), 1994
Metatron (Darkwell album), 2004
"Metatron", a song by The Mars Volta on their 2008 album The Bedlam in Goliath
"Metatron", a song by Carlos Santana on his 2012 album Shape Shifter
"Metatron", a song by Darkside on their 2013 album Psychic

Literature
Metatron, a character from the literary trilogy His Dark Materials
Metatron, a fictional substance mined in Callisto of the Zone of the Enders series

Film and television
 Metatron, the voice of God, a character in the film Dogma, played by Alan Rickman
 Metatron (Supernatural), a recurring character in the television series Supernatural
 Metatron, the voice of God, a character in the series Good Omens, played by Derek Jacobi

Other
Metatron Discovery, a big data analytics platform developed by SK Telecom

See also
Megatron (disambiguation)